Stuart Campbell DSc FRCPEd FRCOG FACOG, was born in Glasgow, Scotland, and graduated from the medical school of Glasgow University. During his training he worked with Ian Donald, who had published some of the first papers on the use of ultrasound in obstetrics.

Campbell went on to become one of the pioneers too, publishing papers on fetal biometry, and developing charts of fetal measurements such the biparietal diameter and head circumference, and formulae for estimating fetal weight using ultrasound.

He went on to work at Queen Charlotte's Hospital in London, before being appointed Professor of Obstetrics and Gynaecology at King's College Hospital, where he established a fetal medicine unit of international renown (now Harris-Birthright Research Centre for Fetal Medicine), where other leading fetal medicine practitioners such as Kypros Nicolaides, and Charles Rodeck would later train and work.

Campbell's work went on to describe the use of ultrasound to diagnose fetal anomalies, and then the use of Doppler ultrasound, in particular uteroplacental Doppler, in the assessment of 'high-risk' pregnancies.

Campbell went on to become Professor of Obstetrics & Gynaecology at St George's Hospital Medical School before his retirement. He was founding President of the International Society of Ultrasound in Obstetrics & Gynecology (ISUOG), and the first editor of the journal Ultrasound in Obstetrics & Gynecology (The White Journal), one of the leading peer-reviewed journals on imaging within obstetrics and gynaecology.

In 1992 he was awarded the Ian Donald Gold Medal of ISUOG in recognition of his contribution to ultrasound in obstetrics & gynecology, with over 400 peer-reviewed publications to his name at the time.

Since 2001 Campbell has been a consultant at CREATE Fertility, which was set up to provide the latest techniques in Reproductive Medicine, Antenatal and Gynaecological scanning.

He has developed his interest in 3D and 4D (moving 3D) imaging and has published papers on a novel method of diagnosing cleft palate. In this work he collaborated with two colleagues at Addenbrookes Hospital, Christoph Lees ( Director of Fetal Medicine), who now has become Professor of Obstetrics and works at Queen Charlotte's Hospital, and Per Hall, oro-facial surgeon.  The technique called the reverse face view provides detailed and reliable information on congenital defects of the fetal palate; hitherto only defects of the lips and alveolus could be visualised by existing techniques.

He was also the first to describe patterns of fetal behaviour such as blinking, smiling, crying and reflexes in early pregnancy. Many of his images and moving 3D sequences of fetal behaviour have been used in television documentaries such as "My Fetus", "Life Before Birth" and "In the Womb".

He has also continued to work as supervisor of the ultrasound arm of the UKCTOCS (Ovarian Cancer Screening) trial.

Positions held 
 President, International Society of Ultrasound in Obstetrics and Gynecology (1990–1998)
 Honorary Fellow, American Institute of Ultrasound in Medicine
 Honorary Life Member, British Medical Ultrasound Society

References 

 Presentation of the 1992 Ian Donald Gold Medal to Stuart Campbell. Ultrasound Obstet Gynecol 2 (1992) 379–380

External links 
 Giants in Obstetrics and Gynecology Series: a profile of Stuart Campbell, DSc, FRCPEd, FRCOG, FACOG
 Stuart Campbell on the History of Modern Biomedicine Research Group website
 Stuart Campbell's profile page on the CREATE Fertility website

Scottish obstetricians
Medical ultrasonography
Living people
Year of birth missing (living people)